Sheepbridge Works F.C. was an English association football club based in Chesterfield, Derbyshire.

Records
Best FA Cup performance: 3rd Qualifying Round, 1893–94, 1996–97

References

Defunct football clubs in England
Defunct football clubs in Derbyshire
Association football clubs established in the 19th century
Works association football teams in England
Sheffield & District Football League